Anita Christensen, (born October 29, 1972, in Randers, Denmark) is a world champion female professional boxer.
She posted a 19–2–0 record as an amateur boxer and was the 1998 Nordic 57-kg Women's Champion before turning professional.

On February 16, 2000, in Give, Denmark, Christensen won her pro debut with a 1st-round TKO over Veronica Szucz.
   
On January 17, 2004, in Aarhus, Denmark, Anita Christensen won a controversial ten round split (93-97 97-94 96-95) decision over Florida-based Ada Vélez to win the WIBA and WIBF Bantamweight titles. Christensen was knocked down in the eighth round, and Velez was the aggressor for much of the fight. 
 
On June 17, 2005, in Aarhus, Denmark, Christensen returned from an 18-month layoff to win a unanimous six-round decision over Oksana Romanova. Christensen progressed to 16-0-0 (6 KO)

Anita Christensen is promoted and managed by Bettina Palle and trained by Brian Mathiasen.

External links

1972 births
Danish women boxers
Living people
People from Randers
21st-century Danish politicians